Deborra Jane Hope,  (born Deborra Brown, October 11, 1955) is a former Canadian journalist, anchor, and producer for Global owned-and-operated station CHAN-DT in Vancouver, British Columbia. She was with that station since 1981, when it was known as BCTV, then a CTV affiliate. Hope hosted the Early News at 5 p.m. and the 'InSight' segment of the News Hour at 6 until she retired in March 2014 after announcing she would be stepping down.  On October 8, 2020, it was later announced that she had developed Alzheimer's disease, with mild symptoms beginning to show at the time she retired. She is currently living in a long-term care facility in Vancouver, British Columbia.

Biography 
Hope was born in Trail, British Columbia, a small town in the west Kootenays. She attended the University of British Columbia, where she started in journalism by reading news on the campus radio station, CiTR and reporting for the school's newspaper, The Ubyssey. She graduated from UBC with a Bachelor of Arts degree.   Hope then attended Carleton University in Ottawa where she received a Bachelor of Journalism (Honors). After graduating, Hope started working for The Canadian Press as a junior reporter. She then returned to British Columbia where she joined the now-defunct United Press Canada, working there for three years before joining BCTV. She is married to Roger Hope, a Global BC news cameraman and has two daughters.  When Hope retired in 2014, she had started to show symptoms of what would be revealed to be Alzheimer's disease.  Her coworkers said they had noticed she was beginning to make mistakes with names and words occasionally  while reading the news, and seemed to be gradually getting forgetful and confused.  After living at home with her family for a number of years, she eventually entered a long-term care facility.

On June 29, 2022, Hope was appointed as a Member of the Order of Canada "for her contributions to Canadian journalism as a reporter and anchor, and for her tireless involvement as a volunteer.”

References

1955 births
Living people
Canadian television news anchors
People from Trail, British Columbia
Journalists from British Columbia
Canadian women television journalists
Global Television Network people
People from Vancouver
Members of the Order of Canada